Laram or Larem or Larm may refer to:
 Larm, Susan, Izeh County
 La République En Marche!, a French centrist political party